Mile Elm is a hamlet in central Wiltshire, England, with a population of around 40 residents.

There was a farm at Mile End in 1728; the area to the east of the road was the tithing of Stock. The hamlet is within the civil parish of Calne Without. Wiltshire Council is the unitary authority which is responsible for all significant local government functions.

Mile Elm backs onto part of the Marquess of Lansdowne's Bowood Estate. Larger nearby villages include Heddington, Bromham and Sandy Lane.

References

Calne Without
Hamlets in Wiltshire